Paathira Sooryan is a 1981 Indian Malayalam-language film, directed by K. P. Pillai and produced by C. K. Prabhakaran Padiyathu. The film stars Prem Nazir, Jayabharathi, Srividya and M. G. Soman. The film had musical score by V. Dakshinamoorthy.

Cast

Prem Nazir as James/Alexander George
Jayabharathi as Radha
Srividya as Jolly
M. G. Soman as Stephen
Adoor Bhasi as Papachan
Kalpana as Friend of Jolly (Srividya)
Prameela as Ayisha
T. R. Omana as Devaki Amma
Prathapachandran as Mathai
Sathaar as Basheer
Baby Sangeetha as Sweety Mol
Jayamalini as Dancer
Vanchiyoor Madhavan Nair
K. J. Yesudas as A Saint

Soundtrack
The music was composed by V. Dakshinamoorthy with lyrics by Sreekumaran Thampi.

References

External links
 

1981 films
1980s Malayalam-language films